The Man Under the Table is a Croatian drama film, directed by Neven Hitrec, based on motifs from short stories by Vjekoslav Domini.

Cast
 Luka Petrušić as Groš
 Jelena Lopatić as Lidija
 Marija Škaričić as Jasna
 Višnja Babić
 Nikša Butijer
 Inge Appelt
 Danko Ljuština
 Vera Zima
 Damir Lončar
 Ljubomir Kerekeš
 Predrag Vušović
 Filip Radoš as Argentinian

References

External links
 

2009 films
2000s Croatian-language films
2009 drama films
Films based on works by Croatian writers
Films based on short fiction
Croatian drama films